Rinyaszentkirály is a village in Somogy county, Hungary

Etymology
According to the local legends Béla IV of Hungary flew there during the Mongol invasion and later he founded the village. The scientific explanation states that it was named after the patron of its church, Saint Stephen of Hungary like Porrogszentkirály.

History
According to László Szita the settlement was completely Hungarian in the 18th century.

External links 
 Street map (Hungarian)

References 

Populated places in Somogy County